The Great Compromise may refer to:

 The Great Compromise (song) by John Prine
 The Great Compromise (album) by The Junior Varsity
 The Connecticut Compromise, provision fundamental to enacting U.S. Constitution